Satara is a genus of moths in the family Erebidae from Sulawesi and South India. The genus was erected by Francis Walker in 1865.

Species

Subgenus Satara Walker, 1865 

 Satara aequata Walker, [1865] (western Sulawesi)
 Satara lorquinii (Felder, 1874) (eastern Sulawesi)

Subgenus Owadasatara Dubatolov & Kishida, 2005 

 Satara everetti (Rothschild, 1910) (southern Sulawesi) 
 Satara nympha Dubatolov & Kishida, 2005 (central Sulawesi)
 Satara cornutiata Kirti & Gill, 2008 (southern India: Karnataka).

References

Dubatolov, V. V. & Kishida, Y. (June 15, 2005). "A review of the genus Satara Walker, 1865, with description of a new subgenus and species (Lepidoptera, Arctiidae)". Tinea. 18 (4): 276–282.
Kirti, J. S. & Gill, N. S. (2008). "First record of genus Satara Walker (Lepidoptera, Arctiidae, Arctiinae) and reporting of a new species from India". Tinea. 20 (3): 159–162.

Spilosomina
Moth genera